White Oak is an unincorporated community in Brown County, in the U.S. state of Ohio.

History
A post office called White Oak was established in 1878, and remained in operation until 1919. The community takes its name from nearby White Oak Creek.

References

Unincorporated communities in Brown County, Ohio
1878 establishments in Ohio
Populated places established in 1878
Unincorporated communities in Ohio